Xi'nanjiao Station, is a station of Line 1 and Line 2 of the Tianjin Metro. It started operations as a Line 1 station in 2006 and as part of Line 2's western section on 1 July 2012.

References

Railway stations in Tianjin
Railway stations in China opened in 2012
Tianjin Metro stations